Crassula dichotoma is a species of succulent plant in the genus Crassula. It is endemic to the Fynbos region from Namaqualand to Agulhas.

References 

dichotoma
 
Plants described in 1760
Taxa named by Carl Linnaeus